Edward M. Zwick (born October 8, 1952) is an American filmmaker and producer of film and television. He has worked primarily in the comedy drama and epic historical film genres, including About Last Night, Glory, Legends of the Fall, and The Last Samurai. He is also the co-creator of the television series thirtysomething and Once and Again.

During his career he has worked with Tom Cruise, Leonardo DiCaprio, Denzel Washington, Bruce Willis, Brad Pitt, Anthony Hopkins, Daniel Craig, Jennifer Connelly, Tobey Maguire, Jake Gyllenhaal, Anne Hathaway, Liev Schreiber and Laura Dern.

Zwick's body of work has earned numerous accolades, including an Academy Award and BAFTA Award for Best Picture as a producer, and Primetime Emmy Awards for Outstanding Drama Series, Outstanding Writing in a Limited Series, and Outstanding Dramatic Special. He has additionally been nominated for multiple Golden Globe Awards.

Early life and education
Zwick was born into a Jewish family in Chicago, Illinois, the son of Ruth Ellen (née Reich) and Allen Zwick. He attended New Trier High School, received an A.B. at Harvard in 1974, and attended the AFI Conservatory, graduating with a Master of Fine Arts degree in 1975.

Career
His films include Glory (1989), Legends of the Fall (1994), The Siege (1998), The Last Samurai (2003), Blood Diamond (2006), and Defiance (2008). Along with Marshall Herskovitz, Zwick runs a film production company called The Bedford Falls Company (inspired by the name of the town featured in Frank Capra's It's a Wonderful Life). This company has produced such notable films as Traffic and Shakespeare in Love and the TV shows thirtysomething, Relativity, Once and Again, and My So-Called Life.

He was one of the recipients of the Academy Award for Best Picture for Shakespeare in Love; he was also nominated in the same category for Traffic.

Despite sharing a surname and profession, Edward is unrelated to fellow director Joel Zwick.

Filmography

Film

Producer only

Television

Television films

Executive producer only

Awards received by Zwick films

References

Further reading
  Review of Defiance.

External links
 
 
 
 

1952 births
AFI Conservatory alumni
Film producers from Illinois
American male screenwriters
Harvard University alumni
Living people
New Trier High School alumni
Writers from Chicago
Filmmakers who won the Best Film BAFTA Award
Producers who won the Best Picture Academy Award
Jewish American screenwriters
Film directors from Illinois
Golden Globe Award-winning producers
Primetime Emmy Award winners
Writers Guild of America Award winners
Screenwriters from Illinois
21st-century American Jews